Yukarıdağlıca is a village in the Gerger District, Adıyaman Province, Turkey. The village is populated by Kurds of the Ziran tribe and had a population of 253 in 2021.

The hamlet of Üçyol is attached to the village.

References

Villages in Gerger District
Kurdish settlements in Adıyaman Province